Tan Wei Shu (born 8 February 1956) is a Malaysian politician. He was the Member of the State Assembly of Kedah for the seat of Bakar Arang from 2008 to 2013.

Tan was elected to the State Assembly in the 2008 election as a member of the People's Justice Party (PKR). He was subsequently appointed to the Executive Council of the incoming government as its only Chinese member. However, he was dropped from the Executive Council in March 2010 by Chief Minister Azizan Abdul Razak. He subsequently resigned from PKR alleging that he had been undermined by party leaders. He did not recontest his seat in the 2013 election.

Before entering politics, he practised traditional Chinese medicine.

Election results

References

Living people
Malaysian people of Chinese descent
People's Justice Party (Malaysia) politicians
Independent politicians in Malaysia
1956 births
People from Kedah
Members of the Kedah State Legislative Assembly
Kedah state executive councillors